Gordon & Helliwell was a start-of-the-20th-century architectural firm based in Toronto, Ontario, Canada.  Principals were Henry Bauld Gordon, RCA, (1854–1951) and Grant Helliwell (1855–1953).

Selected works

 Queen's Theological Hall, Kingston, Ontario, 1879
 Queen's University Kingston, Ontario, Arts Building, Queen's University, 1879-80 
 Knox Church (interior), Toronto, Ontario, 1881
 St. Andrew's Presbyterian Church, Brampton, Ontario, 1881
 Upper Canada Bible and Tract Societies, Toronto, Ontario, 1886
 Kilgour Brothers' Building, Toronto, Ontario, 1886
 Bathurst Street Methodist Church, Toronto, Ontario, 1888
 Parkdale Presbyterian Church, Toronto, Ontario, 1888
 The Great Hall, Toronto, Ontario, 1889
 St. Peter's Church (addition), Toronto, Ontario, 1890
 Church of the Messiah, Toronto, Ontario, 1891
 35 Rosedale Road, Toronto, Ontario, 1891
 Church of the Messiah Rectory, Toronto, Ontario, 1892
 Orillia Opera House (built as Orillia City Hall), Orillia, Ontario, 1895
 Harris Henry Fudger House, Toronto, Ontario, 1897
 40 Maple Avenue, Toronto, Ontario, 1898
 Avenue Road Church, Toronto, Ontario, 1899
 49 Elm Avenue, Toronto, Ontario, 1901
 181 Crescent Road, Toronto, Ontario, 1902
 St. Peter's Anglican Church Rectory, Toronto, Ontario, 1905
 Oaklands (addition), Toronto, Ontario, 1906
 Wycliffe College, Toronto, Dining Hall and Dormitory Wing, 1907; Principal's Residence and new Chapel, 1911.
 Church of the Epiphany, Toronto, Ontario, 1911
 18 Elm Street, Toronto, Ontario, n.d.

References

Architecture firms of Canada
Members of the Royal Canadian Academy of Arts